Filip Jazvić (born 22 October 1990) is a Croatian footballer, who currently plays for Cibalia.

Honours

Player

Club
Rudeš
Croatian Third League: 2008–09 (West) 
Hrvatski Dragovoljac 
Croatian Second League: 2012–13

References

External links
 

1990 births
Living people
People from Bugojno
Association football midfielders
Croatian footballers
NK Hrvatski Dragovoljac players
NK Rudeš players
NK Vrapče players
NK Moslavina players
NK Istra 1961 players
NK Inter Zaprešić players
CFR Cluj players
ASA 2013 Târgu Mureș players
Hapoel Haifa F.C. players
CS Universitatea Craiova players
Arka Gdynia players
Olimpia Grudziądz players
FK Željezničar Sarajevo players
FC Hermannstadt players
HNK Cibalia players
Croatian Football League players
First Football League (Croatia) players
Liga I players
Israeli Premier League players
Ekstraklasa players
I liga players
Premier League of Bosnia and Herzegovina players
Croatian expatriate footballers
Expatriate footballers in Romania
Croatian expatriate sportspeople in Romania
Expatriate footballers in Israel
Croatian expatriate sportspeople in Israel
Expatriate footballers in Poland
Croatian expatriate sportspeople in Poland
Expatriate footballers in Bosnia and Herzegovina
Croatian expatriate sportspeople in Bosnia and Herzegovina